The   ("Ordinance on the Construction and Operation of Railways" / railway regulations), abbreviated as EBO, is a German law regulation specifying rules and regulations for railways.

The orders are enacted by the Federal Ministry of Transport based on enabling act through the General Railway Law ("", first issued on 29. March 1951). The supervisory authority is delegated to the Federal Railway Authority of Germany.

Contrary to trams and light rail operating under the BOStrab tramway regulations, railways operating under the EBO will rely on signals during their normal operation. A third law ESBO covers narrow-gauge railway regulations.

The signalling systems to be used by railways under the EBO regulations are specified in the Railway Signalling Regulations ("" / ESO).

References 

Law of Germany
Rail infrastructure in Germany